"Love on My Mind" is a song by British dance music duo Freemasons. It was released as the first single from their debut album, Shakedown, which was not released until 2007, and features vocals from British singer Amanda Wilson. The song's melody and some of its lyrics sample the 1979 hit "This Time Baby" by Jackie Moore. Additionally, it includes the lyrics from the chorus of the Tina Turner song "When the Heartache Is Over".

Released as a single on 22 August 2005, "Love on My Mind" peaked at number 11 on the UK Singles Chart and reached the top 40 in Flemish Belgium, Ireland and the Netherlands. It additionally charted at number 46 in Australia, where it was the third-most successful club hit of 2005, and at number two on the US Billboard Dance/Mix Show Airplay chart, becoming Freemasons' most successful single in the United States.

Track listing

Charts

Weekly charts

Year-end charts

Release history

References

2005 songs
2005 debut singles
Freemasons (band) songs
Songs written by Graham Stack (record producer)
Songs written by LeRoy Bell
Sony Music Australia singles